The Cozumel Channel is a strait between Cozumel island and the Yucatán Peninsula, Mexico. It is controlled by Mexico.

See also

List of straits

References

Straits of the Caribbean
Bodies of water of Mexico
Mexican coast of the Caribbean
Yucatán Peninsula